5357 Sekiguchi is an Eos asteroid from the outer region of the asteroid belt, approximately  in diameter. It was discovered on 2 March 1992, by Japanese amateur astronomers Tetsuya Fujii and Kazuro Watanabe at the Kitami Observatory in eastern Hokkaidō, Japan. The asteroid was later named after Japanese astronomer Tomohiko Sekiguch.

Orbit and classification 

Sekiguchi is a member the Eos family, the largest asteroid family of the outer main belt consisting of nearly 10,000 asteroids. It orbits the Sun at a distance of 2.7–3.3 AU once every 5 years and 2 months (1,887 days). Its orbit has an eccentricity of 0.10 and an inclination of 9° with respect to the ecliptic. The first precovery was obtained at Goethe Link Observatory in 1950, extending the asteroid's observation arc by 42 years prior to its discovery.

Naming 

This minor planet was named in honor of Japanese astronomer Tomohiko Sekiguch (born 1970), associate professor at Hokkaido University. From 1998 to 2001, he had been observing minor planets at the European Southern Observatory. The official naming citation was published by the Minor Planet Center on 6 April 2012.

Physical characteristics

Rotation period 

In October 2005, a rotational lightcurve of Sekiguchi was obtained from photometric observations by French amateur astronomers René Roy and Laurent Bernasconi. Lightcurve analysis gave a well-defined rotation period of  hours with a brightness variation of 0.72 magnitude.

In October 2010 and November 2011, two more lightcurves were obtained at the Palomar Transient Factory, rendering a period of 5.4048 and 5.4100 hours with an amplitude of 0.58 and 0.27 magnitude, respectively.

Diameter and albedo 

According to the surveys carried out by the Japanese Akari satellite and NASA's Wide-field Infrared Survey Explorer with its NEOWISE mission, Sekiguchi measures between 13.9 and 15.2 kilometers in diameter and its surface has an albedo between 0.192 and 0.3829. The Collaborative Asteroid Lightcurve Link assumes a standard albedo for carbonaceous asteroids of 0.057 and consequently calculates a larger diameter of 25.4 kilometers with an absolute magnitude of 11.7.

References

External links 
 Lightcurve Database Query (LCDB), at www.minorplanet.info
 Dictionary of Minor Planet Names, Google books
 Asteroids and comets rotation curves, CdR – Geneva Observatory, Raoul Behrend
 Discovery Circumstances: Numbered Minor Planets (5001)-(10000) – Minor Planet Center
 
 

005357
Discoveries by Tetsuya Fujii
Discoveries by Kazuro Watanabe
Named minor planets
19920302